The Sherwin Range is a mountain range that is a sub-range of the Sierra Nevada system, in Mono County, eastern California. The range is also known locally as The Sherwins.

Geography
The Sherwin Range is immediately to the south of the Long Valley Caldera, and stretches from just south of the town of Mammoth Lakes. to the Wheeler Crest of the Sierra Nevada. The range lies to the south of the Long Valley Caldera.

The range is named after Jim Sherwin, a prospector who operated the first toll road across the Sierra. Its eastern terminus was at Mammoth Lakes.

Recreation
The Sherwin Range is within Inyo National Forest. It is well known for hiking opportunities in the summer, and backcountry skiing in the winter.

Geology
The range largely consists of reddish metamorphic rock, which are the roof pendant for the Sierra Nevada. This rock was formed in the Paleozoic Era, and then was subsequently recrystallized and warped by the intrusion of the Sierra Nevada batholith underneath it.

Landmarks

Prominent peaks
 Bloody Mountain
 Laurel Mountain
 Mount Morrison
 Red Slate Mountain (tallest peak)
 Mount Baldwin
 McGee Mountain
 Mount Morgan
 Mount Huntington

Other features
 Convict Lake

See also
 List of plants of the Sierra Nevada (U.S.)
 Mountain ranges of Mono County, California

References

External links

 Mammoth Lakes Trail System: Sherwin Lakes Trail
  Mammoth Museum at the Hayden Cabin — homepage.

Mountain ranges of the Sierra Nevada (United States)
Mountain ranges of Mono County, California
Mountain ranges of Northern California